Nirut Surasiang (born February 20, 1979), simply known as Tum, is a Thai retired footballer  who played between 1999 and November 2015. He has two nationalities (Thai & Vietnamese) after registered Vietnamese passport.

International goals

Honours

Club
BEC Tero Sasana
 Thai Premier League Champions (2) : 2000, 2001-02
 Kor Royal Cup Winners (1) : 2001

Binh Dinh 
 Vietnamese Cup Winners (1) : 2004

Navibank Saigon 
 Vietnamese Cup Winners (1) : 2011

External links
 Profile at Goal

1979 births
Living people
Nirut Surasiang
Nirut Surasiang
Association football defenders
Nirut Surasiang
Binh Dinh FC players
Hoang Anh Gia Lai FC players
Navibank Sài Gòn FC players
Nirut Surasiang
Nirut Surasiang
Nirut Surasiang
Nirut Surasiang
Thai expatriate footballers
V.League 1 players
Thai expatriate sportspeople in Vietnam
Expatriate footballers in Vietnam
Nirut Surasiang
Footballers at the 2002 Asian Games
Southeast Asian Games medalists in football
Nirut Surasiang
Competitors at the 2001 Southeast Asian Games
Nirut Surasiang